Florin is derived via intermediary forms from Latin floris meaning flower.

The feminine form is Florina. The Italian equivalent is Fiorino, feminine Fiorina.

People named Florin

Adopted name:
Saint Florin (Florinus of Remüs, died 856 AD), 7th-century saint 
Surname
Carl Rudolf Florin (1894–1965), Swedish botanist 
Elfriede Florin (1912–2006), German actress
Peter Florin (1921–2014), East German politician and diplomat
Ray Florins (1947–) Race Car Driver
Given name
Florin Bratu 
Florin Buhuceanu
Florin Călinescu 
Florin Cernat 
Florin Constantiniu
Florin Corodeanu
Florin Gheorghiu
Florin Gardoș
Florin Halagian 
Florin Hilbay
Florin Krasniqi 
Florin Lovin 
Florin Mergea 
Florin Georgian Mironcic 
Florin Mugur
Florin Pavlovici
Florin Piersic
Florin Popescu
Florin Prunea 
Florin Pucă 
Florin Răducioiu 
Florin Salam
Florin Segărceanu 
Florin Vlaicu

See also
Florian (disambiguation)
Florinus (disambiguation)
Florence (name)
Florina (disambiguation)

Romanian masculine given names